The year 2017 was the second year in the history of the ILFJ, a Japanese Lethwei promotion and the year started with Lethwei in Japan 2: Legacy. The events are streamed online by FITE TV, Abema TV in Japan and through television agreements with MNTV in Myanmar.

List of events

Lethwei in Japan 2: Legacy 

Lethwei in Japan 2: Legacy was a Lethwei event held on February 16, 2017 at the Korakuen Hall in Tokyo, Japan.

Background 
This event featured recently crowned openweight Lethwei World Champion Dave Leduc defending his title for the first time against Lethwei veteran Phoe Kay. For his Lethwei debut, Japanese WPMF kickboxing champion Kouma faced young Myanmar fighter Yar Zar, while Thar Thae Ta Pwint was against Japanese Karate Champion Yuki Yamamoto.

Results

Lethwei in Japan 3: Grit 

Lethwei in Japan 3: Grit was a Lethwei event held on April 18, 2017 at the Korakuen Hall in Tokyo, Japan.

Background 
For his second title defence, openweight Lethwei World Champion Dave Leduc faced Turkish Australian Adem Yilmaz in traditional Lethwei rules. This match was the first Lethwei world title fight headlining two non-Burmese in the sport's history. For the occasion, the Ambassador of Myanmar to Japan was present at the event held in the Korakuen Hall. This event also marked the return to action of former Openweight World Champion Saw Nga Man against Japanese fighter Teruhiko Kubo.

Results

Lethwei in Japan 4: Frontier 

Lethwei in Japan 4: Frontier was a Lethwei event held on June 16, 2017 at the Tokyo Dome City Hall in Tokyo, Japan.

Background 
This event featured the rematch of Thar Thae Ta Pwint vs Hikaru Hasumi. Thara The Ta Pwint ultimately won the first and second exchanged grabbing the ILFJ World Title. Also Openweight Champion Dave Leduc was supposed to face American champion Cyrus Washington, but Washington eventually pulled out of the fight citing a hand injury he sustained in training. Leduc eventually defended his title for the third time against Muaythai world champion Nilmungkorn Sudsakorngym, winning the ILFJ Openweight world title.

Results

Lethwei in Japan 5: Nexurise 

Lethwei in Japan 5: Nexurise was a Lethwei event held on September 28, 2017 at the Korakuen Hall in Tokyo, Japan.

Background 
For unknown reasons, Hanthar Waddy replaced Tun Lwin Moe. Muaythai Champion and Lethwei veteran Pravit Sakmuangtalang, also known by his last name Aor Piriyapinyo faced Thar Thae Ta Pwint. Former Golden Belt Champion, Win Tun came out of retirement for this fight and this event marked the implementation of weight classes like in traditional tournaments.

Results

Lethwei Grand Prix Japan 2017 

Lethwei Grand Prix Japan 2017 was a Lethwei event held on November 15, 2017 at the Korakuen Hall in Tokyo, Japan.

Background 
Openweight champion Dave Leduc was scheduled to be on this card but due to his opponent backing out, the fight was canceled. MMA veteran Daryl Lokuku made his successful Lethwei debut. Yan Naing Aung and Tokeshi Kohei rematched after facing each other at the September event. Julija Stoliarenko faced top Lethwei fighter in Veronika and ultimately won the Japan Lethwei World Title.

Results

See also
2017 in K-1 
2017 in Kunlun Fight
2017 in World Lethwei Championship

References

International Lethwei Federation Japan events
2017 in Lethwei
2017 in kickboxing